The 1924–25 Scottish Division Two was won by Dundee United who, along with second placed Clydebank, were promoted to Division One. Johnstone and Forfar Athletic finished 19th and 20th respectively and were relegated to Division Three.

Table

References 

 Scottish Football Archive

Scottish Division Two seasons
2
Scot